Beulah Beach is an unincorporated community and census-designated place located adjacent to Lake Erie in Erie County, Ohio, United States. As of the 2010 census it had a population of 53. It is located within Vermilion Township.

History
Beulah Beach had its start in 1921 as a summer Christian meeting place for a Bible and Missionary Conference. It currently has a summer camp and retreat center, Beulah Beach Camp and Retreat Center, affiliated with the Christian and Missionary Alliance denomination and a member of the Christian Camp and Conference Association.

From about 1885 through 1920, the same people went for the summer conference to Beulah Park. This was located in Euclid, Ohio, on the east side of Cleveland. When that property was sold, it became part of the Euclid Beach Amusement Park.

For the 1921 Conference, an 85-room building, called The hotel, was ready. It overlooks Lake Erie. From 1926 through the 1931-1932 school, a three-year Bible school was in that building. The Beulah Beulah Beach Bible Institute had its dorm rooms, classrooms, and a chapel in that building with a kitchen and dining room in the basement. The hotel received a renovation in 1988 which enlarged the bathrooms and the sleeping rooms received individual heating and air conditioning wall units.

A large barn from the previous farm was moved to the bluff overlooking Lake Erie. It was the Tabernacle and used for services and meetings until 2017 when it was replaced by the center, a year-round facility with a large meeting room, a gym, and small meeting rooms.

In about 1945, two pastors began youth camp weeks. By the mid-1950's, there were also children's camps. Both continue to be held.

Until about 1968, Beulah Beach had its own post office to which mail was delivered twice each day. It was a room in a house. The Z.I.P. Code was 44020.

Until 1968, the office for the Central District was located at Beulah Beach. It was originally a large district encompassing the states of Missouri, Illinois, Indiana, Michigan, Kentucky, Ohio, and West Virginia. As the census of The Christian and Missionary Alliance grew, various states were developed into other districts. In 1968, the district was again divided and district offices were moved to Norton and Toledo. As of 2022, the Central District comprises West Virginia and eastern Ohio. In 1887, it was the first district to be organized in The Christian and Missionary Alliance. The meeting to form the district was held at Linwood Park, a Christian campground in Vermilion, Ohio.

Geography

U.S. Route 6 forms the southern edge of the community, leading northeast  to the city of Vermilion and west  to Huron. For many years, Ohio Route 2 also ran in front of Beulah Beach. There is now a four-lane highway for that a bit south. Until 1929, the electric Interurban Railway ran past Beulah Beach. Beulah Beach was one of the designated stops.

Demographics

References

External links
Beulah Beach homepage

Geography of Erie County, Ohio
Census-designated places in Ohio
Ohio populated places on Lake Erie
Census-designated places in Erie County, Ohio